Helena Kalokuokamaile Wilcox Salazar-Machado (April 13, 1917 – September 17, 1988) was an aspirant head of the royal family of the Kingdom of Hawaii.

Life
Helena Kalokuokamaile Wilcox was born April 13, 1917. Her father was Robert Kalanikupuapaikalaninui Keōua Wilcox (1893–1934) of the House of Kalokuokamaile, the eldest collateral branch of the House of Kamehameha. Her mother was his first wife Helen Kaleipuanani Simerson Wilburton. Her father Robert Keōua was son of Theresa Owana Kaohelelani Laanui and her second husband Robert William Wilcox (1855–1903).

She based her claim to the Hawaiian crown on her family's descent from King Kamehameha I's eldest half-brother Kalokuokamaile, and through her great grand aunt, Elizabeth Kekaaniau Laanui Pratt, a dynast named by King Kamehameha III, and a student at the Royal School developed to educate royal heirs.  She used the regal name Kalokuokamaile II, stating that she was Kalokuokamaile's successor.

Helena was Alii Nui of the Ka Lahui Hawaii Organization from 1987 until her death.
She wrote a history of the Kaahumanu Society in 1980 titled Kaahumanu Diamond Jubilee: A Brief History.

Family
She married Henry Mario Salazar, younger son of Manuel Bernardino Salazar by his wife María Enriqueta de la Huerta. She married secondly Henry Machado Sr. She had children from her first marriage.

Children
 Henry C. Keaweikekahialiiokamoku Salazar
 Paul C. Kalokuokamaile Salazar
 Michael Carl Kauhiokalani Salazar
 Stephen Craig Laanui Salazar
 Owana Kaohelelani Mahealani-Rose Salazar

She died on September 19, 1988, at the age of 71. Despite having surviving sons, she named Owana Kuhina Nui and Owana's son, Noa, as Aliʻi Nui Kalokuokamaile III. She informed Owana's brothers that their sister and her son would succeed her.

Tree

Citations

 

1917 births
1988 deaths
House of Kalokuokamaile